|website          = Premier Volleyball League
|last             = 2022 Premier Volleyball League Invitational Conference
|next             = 2023 Premier Volleyball League All-Filipino Conference
}}

The 2022 Premier Volleyball League Reinforced Conference was the thirteenth conference of the Premier Volleyball League and its fourth conference as a professional league.

The tournament began on October 8 and finished on December 6, 2022. This is the first reinforced conference in three years, since the last reinforced was commenced way back in 2019. And also the first conference to use a video challenge system. It features nine local teams with one foreign guest player each. Among these nine teams are the returning F2 Logistics Cargo Movers and the debuting team — Akari Chargers.

Participating teams

Venues

Format 
This conference implemented a single round-robin in preliminary and semifinals, and a best-of-three series in the 3rd place match and Championship match. The following format conducted for the entirety of the conference:
Preliminary Round
 The nine teams played in a single round-robin elimination.
 Teams are ranked using the FIVB Ranking System.
 Top four teamsbadvanced to the semifinals.
Semifinals
 The four teams played again in a single round-robin elimination.
 Teams are ranked using the FIVB Ranking System.
 The 3rd and 4th ranked teams advanced to the bronze medal match.
 The 1st and 2nd ranked teams advanced to the gold medal match.
Finals
 Bronze medal: SF Rank 3 vs SF Rank 4 (best-of-three series)
 Gold medal: SF Rank 1 vs SF Rank 2 (best-of-three series)

Transactions

National team players 
The following players  that played in the 2022 Asian Women's Volleyball Cup and the 2022 ASEAN Grand Prix are solely composed of the players from Creamline Cool Smashers.

Team additions and transfers 
The following are the players who transferred to another team for the upcoming conference.

Foreign guest players 
The following are the foreign guest players who are acquired by each team.

Pool standing procedure 
 Number of matches won
 Match points
 Sets ratio
 Points ratio
 If the tie continues as per the point ratio between two teams, the priority will be given to the team which won the last match between them. When the tie in points ratio is between three or more teams, a new classification of these teams in the terms of points 1, 2 and 3 will be made taking into consideration only the matches in which they were opposed to each other.

Match won 3–0 or 3–1: 3 match points for the winner, 0 match points for the loser
Match won 3–2: 2 match points for the winner, 1 match point for the loser.

Preliminary round 
All times are Philippine Standard Time (UTC+8:00).

Ranking 

|}

Match results 
|}

Final round 
All times are Philippine Standard Time (UTC+8:00).

Semifinals

Ranking 

|}

Match results 
|}

Finals

3rd place 
 Creamline wins series, 2–0.

|}

Championship 
 Petro Gazz wins series, 2–0.

|}

Awards and medalists

Individual awards

Medalists

Final standings

Statistics leaders

Preliminary round 
Statistics leaders correct at the end of the preliminary round.

References 

2022 in Philippine sport
2022 in volleyball
2022 in women's volleyball
PVL
PVL
PVL